Paruma is a stratovolcano that lies on the border of Bolivia and Chile. It is part of a ridge that contains several stratovolcanos. Paruma lies at the eastern end of the ridge, with Olca to its west. The older volcano Paruma lies to east of Paruma. Paruma has clearly been active during the Holocene, with many morphologically young lava flows on its flanks. It also has persistent fumaroles. One lava flow in particular extends for 7 kilometres to the south-east of the peak. Historical activity along the ridge has been confined to one eruption from 1865 to 1867, the character of which is not precisely known.

Sources
 

Subduction volcanoes
Volcanoes of Potosí Department
Stratovolcanoes of Chile
Polygenetic volcanoes
Bolivia–Chile border
International mountains of South America
Volcanoes of Antofagasta Region
Holocene stratovolcanoes